Mount Vennum is a mountain surmounting the northeast part of Rowley Massif on the east coast of Palmer Land. It was mapped by the United States Geological Survey (USGS) in 1974 and named by the Advisory Committee on Antarctic Names (US-ACAN) for Walter R. Vennum, a geologist and a member of the USGS geological and mapping party to the Lassiter Coast, 1972–73.

Mountains of Palmer Land